The Sikorsky XP2S was an American biplane patrol flying boat developed for the United States Navy during the early 1930s.

Design and development
After selling a small quantity of PS / RS patrol / transport amphibians to the Navy, Sikorsky (then a division of United Aircraft Corporation) endeavoured to interest the service in a patrol flying boat. Having received a development contract in mid-1930, Sikorsky delivered a complete aircraft for testing in June 1932. The XP2S-1, as the prototype was designated, was a two-bay, equal-span biplane of mixed construction. Its two R-1340 Wasp radial engines were mounted in a single nacelle in a tandem configuration.

Its overall performance did not exceed that of other biplane patrol boats of the era, and after approximately one year of official trials the Navy cancelled the project.

Operators

United States Navy

Specifications (XP2S-1)

See also

References

Citations

Bibliography

Flying boats
Biplanes
Aircraft first flown in 1932
XP2S
1930s United States patrol aircraft
Twin-engined push-pull aircraft